Lalla Bahia bint Antar (unknown –  3 September 2008) was the third wife of Mohammed V of Morocco, who reigned from 1927 until 1961. Bahia was also the mother of Princess Lalla Amina of Morocco.

Lalla Bahia was a lady from a wealthy Berber family and she had Glaoua origins. Abdelssadeq el-Glaoui explained that just like Lalla Abla bint Tahar, her husband's second wife, Lalla Bahia was chosen from the house Glaoui. However, it is not specified whether it is on her maternal or paternal side that she has Glaoua origins.

Bahia died on 3 September 2008. Her funeral was held at the Mausoleum of Mohammed V in Rabat, Morocco.

References 

2008 deaths
Berber Moroccans
Moroccan exiles in Madagascar
Moroccan royalty
Year of birth missing